Negres Tempestes ( or ) may refer to:

 Negres Tempestes (novel), 2010, by Teresa Solana
 Negres Tempestes (organization), an anarchist, pro-Catalan independence group